Sara is a 1997 Polish movie directed by Maciej Ślesicki.

Plot 
Leon (Bogusław Linda), a former commando, returns home after a job in Yugoslavia. One of his young daughters pulls a gun out of his luggage and targets another daughter.

After his wife has left him, and Leon has lost himself in booze, he is roused for an interview with a local criminal ringleader, Jozef (Marek Perepeczko), who is looking for a bodyguard for his 16-year-old daughter, Sara (Agnieszka Włodarczyk). During the interview an attempt is made to assassinate Jozef, and Leon's quick action saves his life. Leon is awarded the job.

Sara at first appears unenthusiastic about her new bodyguard, but during an assassination attempt on her, he protects her with his body. Sarah falls in love with Leon. Initially, Leon is wary of Sara's attentions, but sincere and tender feelings for the girl eventually conquer his heart. Leon and Sarah become lovers. Soon Sara becomes pregnant. Another criminal bigwig comes into possession of compromising photos and passes them to Jozef. A confrontation ensues.

Cast 
 Bogusław Linda as Leon
 Agnieszka Włodarczyk as Sara
 Marek Perepeczko as Joseph
 Cezary Pazura as Cezary,  guard
 Stanisław Brudny as Leon's father
 Krzysztof Kiersznowski as
 Jack Recknitz as Jozef's man
 Grzegorz Miśtal as Sara's  classmate
 Teresa Lipowska as saleslady
 Jarosław Gruda as Gynaecologist

Production 
To appear nude in this film, Agnieszka Włodarczyk, who was 15-years-old during filming, needed the consent of her mother Anna Stasiukiewicz. She was her who persuaded her daughter to play in the film and to begin her career in show business.

Awards and nominations 
 1997 – Award Film Festival in Gdynia (Maciej Ślesicki)
1999 – Award for the best debut at the festival  Stozhary (Agnieszka Wlodarczyk)

References

External links 
 
   
 Review Online nytimes.com

1997 films
Polish drama films
1990s Polish-language films